The Cipancí Wildlife Refuge is a Wildlife refuge of Costa Rica, part of the Tempisque Conservation Area, and protects tropical forest and wetlands on the banks of the Tempisque River near Abangares in the Guanacaste Province.

External links
Cipancí Wildlife Refuge at Costa Rica National Parks

Nature reserves in Costa Rica
Geography of Guanacaste Province